The Laschamp or Laschamps event was a geomagnetic excursion (a short reversal of the Earth's magnetic field). It occurred between 42,200 and 41,500 years ago, during the end of the Last Glacial Period. It was discovered from geomagnetic anomalies found in the Laschamps lava flows in Clermont-Ferrand, France in the 1960s.

The Laschamp event was the first known geomagnetic excursion and remains the most thoroughly studied among the known geomagnetic excursions.

Background and effects
Since its discovery, the magnetic excursion has been demonstrated in geological archives from many parts of the world. The transition from the normal field to the reversed field lasted approximately 250 years, while the magnetic field remained reversed for approximately 440 years. During the transition, Earth's magnetic field declined to a minimum of 5% of its current strength, and was at about 25% of its current strength when fully reversed. This reduction in geomagnetic field strength resulted in more cosmic rays reaching the Earth, causing greater production of the cosmogenic isotopes beryllium-10 and carbon-14, a decrease in atmospheric ozone, and changes in atmospheric circulation.

This loss of the geomagnetic shield is claimed to have contributed to the extinction of Australian megafauna, the extinction of the Neanderthals and the appearance of cave art. However, the lack of corroborating evidence of a causal link between the Laschamp event and population bottlenecks of many megafauna species, and the relatively moderate radio-isotopic changes during the event, have cast significant doubt on the real impact of the Laschamp event on global environmental changes.

Because it occurred approximately 42,000 years ago, the period has been termed the Adams Event or Adams Transitional Geomagnetic Event, a tribute to science fiction writer Douglas Adams, who wrote in The Hitchhiker's Guide to the Galaxy that "42" was the answer to life, the universe and everything.

Research 
The Australian Research Council is funding research to analyze a kauri tree found in New Zealand in 2019. Radiocarbon dating reveals that the tree was alive from 42,500–41,000 years ago, within the timeframe of the event.

See also
 Solar cycle
 Solar cycle 1

Notes
1. The name derives from the Laschamps lava flows from which it was discovered, but appears as 'Laschamp' in most scientific literature.

References

Geomagnetic reversal
Pleistocene events